The 1946 Tennessee Volunteers (variously Tennessee, UT, or the Vols) represented the University of Tennessee in the 1946 college football season. Playing as a member of the Southeastern Conference (SEC), the team was led by head coach Robert Neyland, in his 15th season (his first since the 1940 season, following his service in World War II), and played their home games at Shields–Watkins Field in Knoxville, Tennessee. They finished the season with a record of nine wins and two losses (9–2 overall, 5–0 in the SEC). They concluded the season as SEC champions and with a loss against Rice in the 1947 Orange Bowl.

Schedule

After the season

The 1947 NFL Draft was held on December 16, 1946. The following Volunteers were selected.

References

Tennessee
Tennessee Volunteers football seasons
Southeastern Conference football champion seasons
Tennessee Volunteers football